John Syer (1815–1885) was an English painter. He painted landscape in a style formed chiefly upon that of William Muller, but failed as a colourist.

He exhibited at the Royal Academy, the British Institution, and with the Royal West of England Academy in Bristol, as well as the British Artists, between 1832 and 1875.

He died in July, 1885 and was buried in a family grave on the eastern side of Highgate Cemetery.

References

External links
 

1815 births
1885 deaths
Burials at Highgate Cemetery
19th-century English painters
English male painters
Artists from Bristol
19th-century English male artists